Joseph D. Hatch (January 21, 1811 - May 21, 1898) was a Vermont politician and businessman.  He was most notable for terms in the Vermont House of Representatives and Vermont Senate, and for serving as mayor of Burlington from 1876 to 1883.

Early life
Joseph Denison Hatch (frequently abbreviated as Jo. D. Hatch and J. D. Hatch) was born in Norwich, Vermont on January 21, 1811, a son of Reuben and Eunice (Denison) Hatch.  He attended the schools of Norwich and was a student at Norwich University from 1823 to 1826.  He then began attendance at Dartmouth College, from which he received his Bachelor of Arts degree in 1830.

After finishing his college studies, Hatch settled in Windsor, Vermont, where he operated a successful general store in partnership with his brother Albert.  After Albert Hatch's 1859 death, Joseph Hatch operated the store as the sole partner until he moved to Burlington.  He was active in politics as a Whig and later as a Republican, and represented Windsor in the Vermont House of Representatives from 1853 to 1855 and Windsor County in the Vermont Senate from 1857 to 1859.

Later career
In 1861, Hatch moved to Burlington, where he became an investor in the Central Vermont Railway and the Vermont and Canada Railroad.  He also became active in Burlington's government, serving on the board of aldermen from 1870 to 1876.  Hatch served as mayor from 1876 to 1883, and frequently ran for reelection with the endorsement of both Republicans and Democrats.  As the city's chief executive, Hatch received credit for reductions in the city tax rate and its bonded debt.  In addition, he was credited with the creation of a sinking fund, which the city used to finance future projects, enabling it to avoid incurring additional debt.

Death and burial
Hatch died in Burlington on May 21, 1898.  His funeral took place at Burlington's Cathedral Church of St. Paul.  Attendees included Edward Curtis Smith, Farrand Stewart Stranahan, and Urban A. Woodbury.  Hatch was buried at Lakeview Cemetery in Burlington.

Family
In, 1832, Hatch married Frances Spooner Forbes (1812-1883) of Windsor.  They were the parents of four children.  Frances Elizabeth (1833-1860) was the wife of Isaac Green.  Pattie (1839-1923) was the wife of Daniel Chipman Linsley.  William was born and died in 1846.  Josephine (1847-1936) married Rodney S. Wires.

References

Sources

Books

Newspapers

External links

1811 births
1898 deaths
People from Norwich, Vermont
People from Windsor, Vermont
Politicians from Burlington, Vermont
Dartmouth College alumni
Vermont Whigs
Vermont Republicans
19th-century American politicians
Mayors of Burlington, Vermont
Members of the Vermont House of Representatives
Vermont state senators
Burials at Lakeview Cemetery (Burlington, Vermont)